Engine 88 was a rock band that spawned out of the San Francisco Bay Area in the 1990s.

History 
Engine 88 (originally known as simply Engine) released three albums (2 on Caroline Records) and a handful of seven-inch singles throughout the 1990s. The band featured Tom Barnes of the notable college rock band Sordid Humor as lead singer, Damon Wood of Smoking Section on guitar, Eric Knight on bass and Dave Hawkins (also of Smoking Section) on the drums.

Their first two releases, two 7 inch singles, Funny Car and Twenty were put out independently on their own label, Shut Up and Drive in 1993 and 1994, respectively. In 1995, their first full length LP, Clean Your Room was released on Caroline Records, defining their characteristic sound of driving guitars and rhythms counter-acted with introspective and often abstract lyrics. 1997's Snowman followed, to much critical acclaim.

On July 2, 1997, Counting Crows kicked off a co-headlining tour with The Wallflowers that continued through September.  This tour included opening acts by Bettie Serveert, Engine 88, Gigolo Aunts, and That Dog, with each opening band touring for a three-week stretch. While touring with Counting Crows, The Wallflowers were also playing their own headlining dates when the Counting Crows tour was on break (Counting Crows frontman Adam Duritz experienced swollen vocal cords and had to back out of several shows in July).

In 1998 the group disbanded and their final full-length, Flies and Death n' Stuff was released posthumously in 1998 on Wingnut Records.

At the prompting of Jawbreaker, Engine 88 agreed to reunite for an appearance at Chicago's Riot Fest on Sept 17, 2017.

Where are they now? 
Singer Tom Barnes released a CD entitled Three Day Ditties, which abandoned the louder rock sound of Engine 88, in favor of a more soft rock sound similar to that of his former project, Sordid Humor.  His songs have gained a cult following and have been covered live by the band Counting Crows.

Guitarist Damon Wood is now a software engineer at Pandora performing in a Pretenders tribute band, Message of Love, and in an R&B cover band, Curtis Bumpy, in the San Francisco Bay Area.

Bassist Eric Knight works at UC Berkeley and trains and coaches martial arts at SBG NorCal.

Engine 88 played a "reunion" show commemorating the release of Peter Ellenby's book, Every Day is Saturday at the Bottom of the Hill in San Francisco on Friday, Oct 27 2006.

Drummer, Dave Hawkins, opened a popular movie rental store, Lost Weekend Video, in San Francisco, with Christy Colcord, who previously booked European tours for many US punk bands (including Green Day), and Adam Pfahler of Jawbreaker.

Band members 

Tom Barnes (vocals, guitar)
Damon Wood (guitar)
Eric Knight (bass)
Dave Hawkins (drums)

Discography 
 1993 Funny Car 7": Shut Up and Drive Records
 1994 Germ's Choice 94 (compilation)
 1994 Twenty 7": No Life Records
 1995 Clean Your Room: Caroline Records
 1995 Robots are Real 7" (Split with American Sensei): Hep-Cat Records
 1996 7" Split with Sincola: Caroline Records
 1996 LIVE 105: 10 Year Anniversary (Compilation)
 1997 Snowman Caroline Records
 1997 Seconal (single) Caroline Records
 1997 Manclub (single) Caroline Records
 1998 Flies and Death n' Stuff Wingnut Records

References

External links 
Official Engine 88 Website
Site for Preservation of Engine 88's music
Engine 88 on Allmusic 
Video for "Mangos" (Single from Clean Your Room)
Engine 88's profile on MySpace
Damon Wood's Engine 88 page

Rock music groups from California